Quinteros is a surname. Notable people with the surname include:

Agustina Quinteros, beauty queen who represented Argentina in Miss World 2008 in South Africa
Bansi Quinteros (born 1976), trance keyboardist born in Barcelona
Carlos Quinteros, Guatemalan communist
Daniel Quinteros (born 1976), Argentine football midfielder
Elena Quinteros (1945–1976), school teacher arrested and killed during the civic - military Uruguayan dictatorship
Gustavo Quinteros (born 1965), former Argentine - Bolivian football defender
Henry Quinteros (born 1977), football midfielder from Peru
Jorge Quinteros (born 1974), retired Argentine footballer
Jorge Quinteros (mountaineer), Chilean mountaineer with an extensive career as explorer, guide and teacher
Lorenzo Quinteros (born 1945), Argentine cinema and theatre actor
Luis Ignacio Quinteros, Chilean football striker
Marcelo Quinteros (born 1976), Argentine football midfielder
Marco Andrés Estrada Quinteros (born 1983), Chilean football defender
Miguel Quinteros (born 1947), Argentine chess grandmaster
Paolo Quinteros (born 1979), Argentine professional basketball player